Beaux-Arts architecture was the academic architectural style taught at the École des Beaux-Arts in Paris, particularly from the 1830s to the end of the 19th century. It drew upon the principles of French neoclassicism, but also incorporated Renaissance and Baroque elements, and used modern materials, such as iron and glass. It was an important style in France until the end of the 19th century.

History
The Beaux-Arts style evolved from the French classicism of the Style Louis XIV, and then French neoclassicism beginning with  Style Louis XV and Style Louis XVI. French architectural styles before the French Revolution were governed by Académie royale d'architecture (1671–1793), then, following the French Revolution, by the Architecture section of the Académie des Beaux-Arts. The Academy held the competition for the Grand Prix de Rome in architecture, which offered prize winners a chance to study the classical architecture of antiquity in Rome.

The formal neoclassicism of the old regime was challenged by four teachers at the Academy, Joseph-Louis Duc, Félix Duban, Henri Labrouste and Léon Vaudoyer, who had studied at the French Academy in Rome at the end of the 1820s. They wanted to break away from the strict formality of the old style by introducing new models of architecture from the Middle Ages and the Renaissance. Their goal was to create an authentic French style based on French models. Their work was aided beginning in 1837 by the creation of the Commission of Historic Monuments, headed by the writer and historian Prosper Mérimée, and by the great interest in the Middle Ages caused by the publication in 1831 of The Hunchback of Notre-Dame by Victor Hugo.
Their declared intention was to "imprint upon our architecture a truly national character."

The style referred to as Beaux-Arts in English reached the apex of its development during the Second Empire (1852–1870)
and the Third Republic that followed. The style of instruction that produced Beaux-Arts architecture continued without major interruption until 1968.

The Beaux-Arts style heavily influenced the architecture of the United States in the period from 1880 to 1920. In contrast, many European architects of the period 1860–1914 outside France gravitated away from Beaux-Arts and towards their own national academic centers. Owing to the cultural politics of the late 19th century, British architects of Imperial classicism followed a somewhat more independent course, a development culminating in Sir Edwin Lutyens's New Delhi government buildings.

Training
The Beaux-Arts training emphasized the mainstream examples of Imperial Roman architecture between Augustus and the Severan emperors, Italian Renaissance, and French and Italian Baroque models especially, but the training could then be applied to a broader range of models: Quattrocento Florentine palace fronts or French late Gothic. American architects of the Beaux-Arts generation often returned to Greek models, which had a strong local history in the American Greek Revival of the early 19th century. For the first time, repertories of photographs supplemented meticulous scale drawings and on-site renderings of details.

Beaux-Arts training made great use of agrafes, clasps that link one architectural detail to another; to interpenetration of forms, a Baroque habit; to "speaking architecture" (architecture parlante) in which the appropriateness of symbolism was paid particularly close attention.

Beaux-Arts training emphasized the production of quick conceptual sketches, highly finished perspective presentation drawings, close attention to the program, and knowledgeable detailing. Site considerations included the social and urban context.

All architects-in-training passed through the obligatory stages—studying antique models, constructing , analyses reproducing Greek or Roman models, "pocket" studies and other conventional steps—in the long competition for the few desirable places at the Académie de France à Rome (housed in the Villa Medici) with traditional requirements of sending at intervals the presentation drawings called envois de Rome.

Characteristics

Beaux-Arts architecture depended on sculptural decoration along conservative modern lines, employing French and Italian Baroque and Rococo formulas combined with an impressionistic finish and realism. In the façade shown above, Diana grasps the cornice she sits on in a natural action typical of Beaux-Arts integration of sculpture with architecture.

Slightly overscaled details, bold sculptural supporting consoles, rich deep cornices, swags and sculptural enrichments in the most bravura finish the client could afford gave employment to several generations of architectural modellers and carvers of Italian and Central European backgrounds. A sense of appropriate idiom at the craftsman level supported the design teams of the first truly modern architectural offices.

Characteristics of Beaux-Arts architecture included:

 Flat roof
 Rusticated and raised first story
 Hierarchy of spaces, from "noble spaces"—grand entrances and staircases—to utilitarian ones
 Arched windows
 Arched and pedimented doors
 Classical details: references to a synthesis of historicist styles and a tendency to eclecticism; fluently in a number of "manners"
 Symmetry
 Statuary, sculpture (bas-relief panels, figural sculptures, sculptural groups), murals, mosaics, and other artwork, all coordinated in theme to assert the identity of the building
 Classical architectural details: balustrades, pilasters, festoons, cartouches, acroteria, with a prominent display of richly detailed clasps (agrafes), brackets and supporting consoles
 Subtle polychromy

Beaux-Arts architecture by country

Lego (disambiguation)

Belgium 

Even though the style was not used as much as in neighbouring country France, some examples of Beaux-Arts buildings can still be found in Belgium. The most prominent of these examples is the Royal Museum for Central Africa in Tervuren, but the complexes and triumphal arch of the Cinquantenaire/Jubelpark in Brussels and expansions of the Palace of Laeken in Brussels and Royal Galleries of Ostend also carry the Beaux-Arts style, created by the French architect Charles Girault. Furthermore, various large Beaux-Arts buildings can also be found in Brussels on the Avenue Molière/Molièrelaan. As an old student of the École des Beaux-Arts and as a designer of the Petit Palais, Girault was the figurehead of the Beaux-Arts around the 20th century. After the death of Alphonse Balat, he became the new and favourite architect of Leopold II of Belgium. Since Leopold was the grandson of Louis Philippe I of France, he loved this specific building style which is similar to and has its roots in the architecture that has been realized in the 17th and 18th century for the French crown.

Beaux-Arts buildings in Belgium 
 1782: Palace of Laeken, Brussels (extensions)
 1880: Cinquantenaire/Jubelpark, Brussels (complexes and triumphal arch)
 1898: Royal Museum for Central Africa, Tervuren
 1902–1906: Royal Galleries of Ostend, Ostend (extensions)
 1908: Avenue Molière 177–179 / Avenue Brugmann 176–178, Brussels (a combination of Art Nouveau, Beaux-Arts and eclecticism)
 1909: Avenue Molière 193, Brussels
 1910: Avenue Molière 128, Brussels
 1910: Avenue Molière 130, Brussels
 1910: Avenue Molière 132, Brussels
 1910: Avenue Molière 207, Brussels
 1912: Avenue Molière 519, Brussels
 1912: Avenue Molière 305, Brussels

France 

The Beaux-Arts style in France in the 19th century was initiated by four young architects trained at the École des Beaux-Arts, architects; Joseph-Louis Duc, Félix Duban, Henri Labrouste and Léon Vaudoyer, who had first studied Roman and Greek architecture at the Villa Medici in Rome, then in the 1820s began the systematic study of other historic architectural styles, including French architecture of the Middle Ages and Renaissance. They instituted teaching about a variety of architectural styles at the École des Beaux-Arts, and installed fragments of Renaissance and Medieval buildings in the courtyard of the school so students could draw and copy them. Each of them also designed new non-classical buildings in Paris inspired by a variety of different historic styles: Labrouste built the Sainte-Geneviève Library (1844–1850), Duc designed the new Palais de Justice and Court of Cassation on the Île-de-la-Cité (1852–1868), Vaudroyer designed the Conservatoire national des arts et métiers (1838–1867), and Duban designed the new buildings of the École des Beaux-Arts. Together, these buildings, drawing upon Renaissance, Gothic and Romanesque and other non-classical styles, broke the monopoly of neoclassical architecture in Paris.

Germany 

Germany is one of the countries where the Beaux-Arts style was well received, along with Baroque Revival architecture. The style was especially popular and most prominently featured in the now non-existent region of Prussia during the German Empire. The best example of Beaux-Arts buildings in Germany today are the Bode Museum in Berlin, and the Laeiszhalle and Hochschule für Musik und Theater Hamburg in Hamburg.

Beaux-Arts buildings in Germany 
1898–1904: Bode Museum, Berlin
1904–1908: Laeiszhalle, Hamburg
1888–1913: Hochschule für Musik und Theater Hamburg, Hamburg

Hungary

Beaux-Arts buildings in Hungary 
 1875–1877: Budapest Nyugati railway station, Budapest

Italy

Beaux-Arts buildings in Italy 
1908: Hotel Excelsior, Naples

Netherlands 

Compared to other countries like France and Germany, the Beaux-Arts style never really became prominent in the Netherlands. However, a handful of significant buildings have nonetheless been made in this style during the period of 1880 to 1920, mainly being built in the cities of Rotterdam, Amsterdam and The Hague.

Beaux-Arts buildings in the Netherlands 
1880–1889:  (destroyed during the German bombing of Rotterdam in 1940)
1883: Blauwbrug, Amsterdam
1883: , Amsterdam
1898: , Rotterdam
1914–1920: Rotterdam City Hall (partially damaged during the Rotterdam Blitz of 1940 but later restored)
1915–1923: Former  (partially damaged during the Rotterdam Blitz of 1940 but later restored)
1907–1913: Peace Palace, The Hague

Portugal

Beaux-Arts buildings in Portugal 

 1909–1911: Building on Rua , Lisbon
 1912: Headquarters of the Orders of Engineers, Lisbon
 1913: , Lisbon
 Central Institute of National Assistance to Tuberculosis Portugal, Lisbon

Romania 

In the Romanian Old Kingdom, towards the end of the century, many administrative buildings and private homes are built in the «Beaux-Arts» or «Eclectic» style, brought from France through French architects who came here for work in Romania, schooled in France. The National Bank of Romania Palace on Strada Lipscani, built between 1883 and 1885 is a good example of this style, decorated not just with columns (mainly Ionic), but also with allegorical statues placed in niches, that depict Agriculture, Industry, Commerce and Justice. Because of the popularity of this style, it changed the way Bucharest looks, making it similar in some way with Paris, which led to Bucharest being seen as "Little Paris". Eclecticism was very popular not just in Bucharest and Iași, the two biggest cities of Romania at that time, but also in smaller ones like Craiova, Caracal, Râmnicu Vâlcea, Pitești, Ploiești, Buzău, Botoșani, Piatra Neamț etc. This style was used not only for administrative palaces and big houses of wealthy people, but also for middle class homes.

Spain

Beaux-Arts buildings in Spain 
1876: Royal Economic Society of Friends of the Country of Cartagena building, Cartagena
1876–1882: North Station, Madrid
1981: Casa Resines, Valladolid
1886: Gutierrez Passage, Valladolid
1902: Hotel Santo Mauro, Madrid
1905–1910: Casino de Madrid
1907–1911: Metropolis Building, Madrid
1908–1911: Calle de Montalbán 5, Madrid
1913–1916: Reynot House, Madrid
1919–1924: Gran Vía 24, Madrid
1920–1923: Homes for the Marquis of Encinares, Madrid
1921–1923: Mansion of Tomás de Beruete, Madrid
1922: Former Humanities Center of the Spanish National Research Council, Madrid
1924: Calle Mayor 6, Madrid
1915–1928:

North America

Canada

Beaux-Arts was very prominent in public buildings in Canada in the early 20th century. Notably all three prairie provinces' legislative buildings are in this style.

Beaux-Arts buildings in Canada
1898: London and Lancashire Life Building, Montreal
1903: Old Montreal Stock Exchange Building
1905: Alden Hall, Meadville
1906: Toronto Power Generating Station, Niagara Falls
1907: Royal Alexandra Theatre, Toronto
1909: Linton Apartments, Montreal
1912: Sun Tower, Vancouver
1912: Montreal Museum of Fine Arts, Montreal
1912: Senate of Canada Building (originally a railway station by Ross and Macdonald), Ottawa
1912: Saskatchewan Legislative Building, Regina
1913: Alberta Legislative Building, Edmonton
1913–1920: Union Station, Toronto
1913–1931: Sun Life Building, Montreal
1920: Manitoba Legislative Building, Winnipeg
1920: Millennium Centre, Winnipeg
1923: Commemorative Arch, Royal Military College of Canada in Kingston, Ontario
1923–1924: Bank of Nova Scotia, Ottawa
1924–2017: Former Superior Court of Justice Building, Thunder Bay 
1927:  Union Station, Toronto
1930: Dominion Square Building, Montreal
1931: Canada Life Building, Toronto
1932: Mount Royal Chalet, Montreal
1932: Indigenous Peoples Space, Ottawa (formerly the United States Embassy)
1935: Dominion Public Building, Toronto
1943: Hockey Hall of Fame (formerly a branch of the Bank of Montreal), Toronto

Beaux-Arts architects in Canada
 William Sutherland Maxwell
 John M. Lyle
 Ross and Macdonald
 Sproatt & Rolph
 Pearson and Darling
 Ernest Cormier
 E.J. Lennox
 Jean-Omer Marchand :fr:Jean-Omer Marchand

United States

Beaux-Arts architecture had a strong influence on architecture in the United States because of the many prominent American architects who studied at the École des Beaux-Arts, including Henry Hobson Richardson, John Galen Howard, Daniel Burnham, and Louis Sullivan.

The first American architect to attend the École des Beaux-Arts was Richard Morris Hunt, between 1846 and 1855, followed by Henry Hobson Richardson in 1860. They were followed by an entire generation. Richardson absorbed Beaux-Arts lessons in massing and spatial planning, then applied them to Romanesque architectural models that were not characteristic of the Beaux-Arts repertory. His Beaux-Arts training taught him to transcend slavish copying and recreate in the essential fully digested and idiomatic manner of his models. Richardson evolved a highly personal style (Richardsonian Romanesque) freed of historicism that was influential in early Modernism.

The "White City" of the World's Columbian Exposition of 1893 in Chicago was a triumph of the movement and a major impetus for the short-lived City Beautiful movement in the United States. Beaux-Arts city planning, with its Baroque insistence on vistas punctuated by symmetry, eye-catching monuments, axial avenues, uniform cornice heights, a harmonious "ensemble," and a somewhat theatrical nobility and accessible charm, embraced ideals that the ensuing Modernist movement decried or just dismissed. The first American university to institute a Beaux-Arts curriculum is the Massachusetts Institute of Technology (MIT) in 1893, when the French architect Constant-Désiré Despradelle was brought to MIT to teach. The Beaux-Arts curriculum was subsequently begun at Columbia University, the University of Pennsylvania, and elsewhere. From 1916, the Beaux-Arts Institute of Design in New York City schooled architects, painters, and sculptors to work as active collaborators.

Beaux-Arts buildings in the United States

Numerous American university campuses were designed in the Beaux-Arts, notably: Columbia University, (commissioned in 1896), designed by McKim, Mead & White; the University of California, Berkeley (commissioned in 1898), designed by John Galen Howard; the United States Naval Academy (built 1901–1908), designed by Ernest Flagg; the campus of MIT (commissioned in 1913), designed by William W. Bosworth; Emory University and Carnegie Mellon University (commissioned in 1908 and 1904, respectively), both designed by Henry Hornbostel; and the University of Texas (commissioned in 1931), designed by Paul Philippe Cret.

While the style of Beaux-Art buildings was adapted from historical models, the construction used the most modern available technology. The Grand Palais in Paris (1897–1900) had a modern iron frame inside; the classical columns were purely for decoration. The 1914–1916 construction of the Carolands Chateau south of San Francisco was built to withstand earthquakes, following the devastating 1906 San Francisco earthquake. The noted Spanish structural engineer Rafael Guastavino (1842–1908), famous for his vaultings, known as Guastavino tile work, designed vaults in dozens of Beaux-Arts buildings in Boston, New York, and elsewhere. 

Beaux-Arts architecture also brought a civic face to railroads. Chicago's Union Station, Detroit's Michigan Central Station, Jacksonville's Union Terminal, Grand Central Terminal and the original Pennsylvania Station in New York, and Washington, D.C.'s Union Station are famous American examples of this style. Cincinnati has a number of notable Beaux-Arts style buildings, including the Hamilton County Memorial Building in the Over-the-Rhine neighborhood, and the former East End Carnegie library in the Columbia-Tusculum neighborhood. 

An ecclesiastical variant on the Beaux-Arts style is Minneapolis' Basilica of St. Mary, the first basilica in the United States, which was designed by Franco-American architect Emmanuel Louis Masqueray (1861–1917) and opened in 1914, and a Freemason temple variant, the Plainfield Masonic Temple, in Plainfield, New Jersey, designed by John E. Minott in 1927. Other examples include the main branch of the New York Public Library; Bancroft Hall at the Naval Academy, the largest academic dormitory in the world; and Michigan Central Station in Detroit, the tallest railway station in the world at the time of completion.

Beaux-Arts architects in the United States
In the late 1800s, during the years when Beaux-Arts architecture was at a peak in France, Americans were one of the largest groups of foreigners in Paris. Many of them were architects and students of architecture who brought this style back to America. The following individuals, students of the École des Beaux-Arts, are identified as creating work characteristic of the Beaux-Arts style within the United States:

 Otto Eugene Adams
 William A. Boring
 William W. Bosworth
 Arthur Brown Jr.
 Daniel Burnham
 Carrère and Hastings
 James Edwin Ruthven Carpenter Jr.
 Paul Philippe Cret
 Edward Emmett Dougherty
 Ernest Flagg
 Robert W. Gibson
 C. P. H. Gilbert
 Cass Gilbert
 Thomas Hastings
 Raymond Hood
 Henry Hornbostel
 John Galen Howard
 Richard Morris Hunt
 Albert Kahn
 Charles Klauder
 Ellamae Ellis League
 Electus D. Litchfield
 Austin W. Lord
 Emmanuel Louis Masqueray
 William Rutherford Mead
 John E. Minott
 Julia Morgan
 Charles Follen McKim
 Harry B. Mulliken
 Kenneth MacKenzie Murchison
 Henry Orth
 Theodore Wells Pietsch I
 Willis Polk
 John Russell Pope
 Reed and Stem
 Arthur Wallace Rice
 Henry Hobson Richardson
 Francis Palmer Smith
 Louis Sullivan
 Edward Lippincott Tilton
 Evarts Tracy of Tracy and Swartwout
 Horace Trumbauer
 Enock Hill Turnock
 Whitney Warren
 Stanford White

Charles McKim, William Mead, and Stanford White would ultimately become partners in the prominent architectural firm of McKim, Mead & White, which designed many well-known Beaux-Arts buildings.

South America

Argentina

From 1880 the so-called Generation of '80 came to power in Argentine politics. These were admirers of France as a model republic, particularly with regard to culture and aesthetic tastes. Buenos Aires is a center of Beaux-Arts architecture which continued to be built as late as the 1950s.

Beaux-Arts buildings in Argentina
1877–1894: Palacio de Aguas Corrientes, Buenos Aires
1889–1908: Teatro Colón, Buenos Aires
1889:  (Argentine pavilion from the 1889 Paris Exposition Universelle), taken down and reconstructed in Buenos Aires (demolished in 1932)
1890: , Mar del Plata (the train station was closed in 1949, and was later damaged by fire. Although it was renovated, it is today much less adorned)
1894–1898: Buenos Aires House of Culture, Buenos Aires
1898–1906: Palace of the Argentine National Congress, Buenos Aires
1908–1910: , Mar del Plata (burned down in 1961)
1908–1928: Kirchner Cultural Centre, Buenos Aires
1926–1931: Buenos Aires City Legislature Palace, Buenos Aires
1908–1910: Tucumán Government Palace, San Miguel de Tucumán
1924–1929: Estrugamou Building, Buenos Aires

Beaux-Arts architects in Argentina
 Alejandro Bustillo
 Julio Dormal
 Gainza y Agote
 Alejandro Christophersen
 Eduardo Le Monnier
  (later an exponent of rationalism)
 Paul Pater
 

 

 Carlos Thays (landscape architect)

Brazil

Beaux-Arts buildings in Brazil
 1858: , São Paulo
 1890–1894: , São Paulo
 1896–1899: 
 1903–1911: Municipal Theater of São Paulo
 1909: , Santos, São Paulo
 1910: , São Paulo
 1911: 
 1922–1926: Tiradentes Palace, Rio de Janeiro
 1923: , São Paulo
 1926–1929: , São Paulo
 Artemis Hotel, São Paulo
 Banco de São Paulo Building, São Paulo
 Hôtel de La Rotisserie Sportsman, São Paulo
 Mococa Building, São Paulo

Colombia

Peru

Beaux-Arts buildings in Peru
1855: Club Nacional, Lima
1906–1939: Legislative Palace, Lima
1919–1924: Edificio Rímac, Lima

Africa

Mozambique

Beaux-Arts buildings in Mozambique
 1901?: Municipal Market, Maputo
 1933: Gil Vicente Theater, Maputo
 Banco da Beira, Beira
 Casa Ana, Beira
 Casa Infante de Sagres, Beira
 Edifício do Almoxarifado, Beira
 Escola de Artes e Ofícios, Beira
 Palácio dos Desportos, Beira
 Standard Bank Building, Beira
 Tribunal da Beira

Asia

Japan

Beaux-Arts buildings in Japan
1918: Kobe Yusen Building, Kobe
1926–1929: Mitsui Main Building, Tokyo
1930–1934: Meiji Life Insurance Building, Tokyo
 Yokohama Yusen Building

Philippines

Beaux-Arts buildings in Philippines
1914: El Hogar Filipino Building, Escolta, Manila
1915: Regina Building, Escolta, Manila
1919: Jones Bridge, Ermita and Binondo, Manila
1919: Luneta Hotel, Ermita, Manila
1924–1927: University of Santo Tomas Main Building, Sampaloc, Manila
1928: Natividad Building, Escolta, Manila
1938: Calvo Building, Escolta, Manila
Juan Luna Building
1919 Grand Cafe building Manila
 Natalio Enriquez Mansion, Sariaya, Quezon
 Filipinas Insurance co. building
 Lizares Mansion, Iloilo City 
 National Museum of Anthropology (Manila)
 National Museum of Natural History (Manila)
 Manila City Hall
 Manila Post office
 Lingayen capitol
 Negros Occidental capitol
 Philippine General Hospital
 1911 Nurse's home, Philippine General hospital
 Philippine Women's University
 1920 - La Salle Hall
 1916 Aduana de Iloilo
 Batangas capitol
 Sorsogon provincial capitol
 Rizal Hall Manila
 Casa Boix, Quiapo, Manila
 Trinidad ancestral house, Iba, Zambales 
 Gawas harigi house, Carigara, Leyte

Oceania

Australia

Several Australian cities have some significant examples of the style. It was typically applied to large, solid-looking public office buildings and banks, particularly during the 1920s.

Beaux-Arts buildings in Australia
1900–1910: Flinders Street railway station, Melbourne
1914–1923: General Post Office building, Forrest Place, Perth
1916: Perpetual Trustee Company Limited, Hunter Street, Sydney
1917: Former Mail Exchange Building, Melbourne
1920: National Theatre, Melbourne
1925–1928: Commonwealth Bank building, Martin Place, Sydney
1926: Argus Building, La Trobe Street, Melbourne
1927: Emily McPherson College of Domestic Economy, Melbourne
1928–1930: Bank of New South Wales building, Elizabeth Street, Brisbane
1928: Port Authority building, Melbourne
1928: Herald & Weekly Times Building, Flinders Street, Melbourne
1933: Commonwealth Bank building, Forrest Place, Perth

New Zealand

Beaux-Arts buildings in New Zealand
1928–1930: Auckland railway station, Auckland

See also
 Academic art
 Second Empire architecture
 Beaux Arts Village, Washington

References

Bibliography
 
a ddi

Further reading
 Reed, Henry Hope and Edmund V. Gillon Jr. 1988. Beaux-Arts Architecture in New York: A Photographic Guide (Dover Publications: Mineola NY)
 United States. Commission of Fine Arts. 1978, 1988 (2 vols.). Sixteenth Street Architecture (The Commission of Fine Arts: Washington, D.C.: The Commission) – profiles of Beaux-Arts architecture in Washington D.C. SuDoc FA 1.2: AR 2.

External links

 New York architecture images, Beaux-Arts gallery
 Advertisement film about the usage of the Beaux Arts style as a reference in kitchen design
 Hallidie Building

 
Architectural styles
Neoclassical architecture
Neoclassical movements
Revival architectural styles
19th-century architectural styles
20th-century architectural styles